Caloptilia jasminicola is a moth of the family Gracillariidae. It is known from Fujian and Guangdong, China.

The larvae feed on Jasminum sambac. They mine the leaves of their host plant.

References

jasminicola
Moths of Asia
Moths described in 1990